Sandwich is a town in Carroll County, New Hampshire, United States. Its population was 1,466 at the 2020 census. Sandwich includes the villages of Center Sandwich and North Sandwich. Part of the White Mountain National Forest is in the north, and part of Squam Lake is in the southwestern corner of the town. As such, Sandwich lies on the boundary between New Hampshire's Lakes Region and White Mountains Region. The Sandwich Range of the White Mountains lies partially within the town, as does the namesake Sandwich Mountain. The town is home to the Sandwich Fair, a popular agricultural fair that occurs every October.

History 

Chartered in 1763 by colonial Governor Benning Wentworth, the land was considered so inaccessible that the grant was enlarged, making Sandwich one of the largest towns in the state. It was named in honor of John Montagu, 4th Earl of Sandwich, said to be the inventor of the sandwich.

The earliest European settlers arrived in 1767. By 1830 Sandwich had grown to a population of 2,700, nearly double the current (2020) population. At that time the town contained farms, stores, mills, churches, schools, carpenters, blacksmiths, and wheelwrights.

By the end of the 1800s much of the population had left Sandwich to live in cities to the west. Sandwich began to be an attraction for visitors, summer residents and artists, which continues to this day.

The League of New Hampshire Craftsmen began in Sandwich as "Sandwich Home Industries" in 1920, and continues statewide today.  Each fall the town hosts the Sandwich Fair. The Durgin Bridge, built in 1864, is a covered bridge in the eastern section of town.

Geography

Sandwich is drained to the east by the Bearcamp and Cold rivers, to the northwest by the Beebe River, to the southwest by Squam Lake, and to the south by the Red Hill River. The Bearcamp and Cold rivers are part of the Saco River watershed, draining east into Maine, while the remainder of the town is part of the Merrimack River watershed, draining south to Massachusetts. Part of the Squam Mountains is in the west. Part of the Sandwich Range is in the north, including the  Sandwich Mountain (also known as Sandwich Dome), the highest point in town as well as in Carroll County.

The primary settlement in the town is Center Sandwich. Other villages include Sandwich, North Sandwich, and Whiteface.

Demographics

As of the census of 2010, there were 1,326 people, 617 households, and 405 families residing in the town. There were 1,057 housing units, of which 440, or 41.6%, were vacant. 373 of the vacant units were for seasonal or recreational use. The racial makeup of the town was 98.0% white, 0.2% African American, 0.2% Native American, 0.5% Asian, 0.1% Native Hawaiian or Pacific Islander, 0.0% some other race, and 1.1% from two or more races. 0.5% of the population were Hispanic or Latino of any race.

Of the 617 households, 19.3% had children under the age of 18 living with them, 55.1% were headed by married couples living together, 7.9% had a female householder with no husband present, and 34.4% were non-families. 27.4% of all households were made up of individuals, and 13.9% were someone living alone who was 65 years of age or older. The average household size was 2.15, and the average family size was 2.59.

In the town, 16.3% of the population were under the age of 18, 3.8% were from 18 to 24, 15.9% from 25 to 44, 40.9% from 45 to 64, and 23.2% were 65 years of age or older. The median age was 53.2 years. For every 100 females, there were 96.4 males. For every 100 females age 18 and over, there were 93.7 males.

For the period 2011–2015, the estimated median annual income for a household was $57,000, and the median income for a family was $63,824. Male full-time workers had a median income of $57,917 versus $40,804 for females. The per capita income for the town was $31,599. 10.0% of the population and 7.3% of families were below the poverty line. 22.3% of the population under the age of 18 and 5.3% of those 65 or older were living in poverty.

Transportation 

Four New Hampshire state highways cross the town:

NH 25 crosses the town's southeastern corner, from Moultonborough in the south to Tamworth in the east.  It is locally known as Whittier Highway.
NH109 enters from Moultonborough in the south and terminates in the Center Sandwich, near the fairgrounds, at NH 113.  It is known locally as Wentworth Hill Road.
NH 113 is the main east-west route across town, entering from Holderness in the west, where it is known as Holderness Road.  In Center Sandwich, it becomes Main Street, and at the northern terminus of NH 109, it turns north along Maple Street.  The name changes to North Sandwich Road until the village of North Sandwich, where it turns onto Beede Flats Road before entering Tamworth to the east.
NH 113A has its western terminus in North Sandwich at NH 113, then goes north along Whiteface Road before turning hard to the east along Chase Road and entering Tamworth at the northeastern corner of town.

Sites of interest 
 John Davidson's Club Sandwich
 Sandwich Historical Society Museum
 Sandwich Fair
 Squam Lake, site of some location filming for the 1981 feature film On Golden Pond

Notable people 

 Isaac Adams (1802–1883), inventor, Massachusetts politician
 Dixi Crosby (1800–1873), surgeon, educator, born in the town
 Claude Rains (1889–1967), earned four Oscar nominations for supporting actor, portrayed Captain Renault in the film Casablanca; lived in Sandwich from 1956 until his death in March 1967
 "Long John" Wentworth (1815–1888), Illinois politician, former mayor of Chicago
 Norbert Wiener (1894–1964), the founder of cybernetics, summered at his cottage in Sandwich until his death in 1964. Wiener and his wife Margaret are buried in Sandwich

See also

 Sandwich, Illinois, named after Sandwich, New Hampshire

References

External links
 
 Sandwich Historical Society
 New Hampshire Economic and Labor Market Information Bureau Profile
 Squam Lakes Association

 
Towns in Carroll County, New Hampshire
Towns in New Hampshire